Karim Handawy (born 1 May 1988) is an Egyptian handball player who plays for Khaleej and the Egyptian national team.

He represented Egypt at the World Men's Handball Championship in 2015, 2017, 2019, 2021, and 2023 and in the 2020 and 2016 Summer Olympics.

References

External links

1988 births
Living people
Egyptian male handball players
Handball players at the 2016 Summer Olympics
Olympic handball players of Egypt
Expatriate handball players
Egyptian expatriate sportspeople in Turkey
Egyptian expatriate sportspeople in Romania
Sportspeople from Cairo
Beşiktaş J.K. Handball Team players
Handball players at the 2020 Summer Olympics
Competitors at the 2013 Mediterranean Games
Competitors at the 2022 Mediterranean Games
Mediterranean Games gold medalists for Egypt
Mediterranean Games silver medalists for Egypt
Mediterranean Games medalists in handball
21st-century Egyptian people